Kenneth Raymond Vinyard (born June 18, 1947)  is a former placekicker in the National Football League (NFL). Vinyard was drafted by the Green Bay Packers in the sixth round of the 1969 NFL Draft and would play the following season with the Atlanta Falcons.

References

Sportspeople from Amarillo, Texas
Atlanta Falcons players
American football placekickers
Texas Tech Red Raiders football players
1947 births
Living people
Players of American football from Texas